The Missa brevis in D minor, K. 65/61a, is a mass composed by Wolfgang Amadeus Mozart (12 years old at the time) and completed on 14 January 1769. It is scored for SATB soloists and choir, violin I and II, 3 trombones colla parte, and basso continuo.

It is thought that this mass was performed in the University of Salzburg's Kollegienkirche to open a forty-hour vigil. As a Lenten mass, it is likely that the Gloria could not have been performed on this occasion, and would have been composed for subsequent use. This is Mozart's shortest setting of the Order of Mass, and his only missa brevis set in a minor key. 

The mass is divided into six movements.

 Kyrie Adagio, D minor, common time
 "Kyrie eleison" – Allegro, D minor, 3/4
 Gloria Allegro moderato, D minor, common time
 Credo Allegro moderato, D minor, 3/4
 "Et incarnatus est" Adagio, D minor, cut common time
 "Et resurrexit" Allegro moderato, D minor, 3/4
 "Et vitam venturi saeculi" Più mosso, D minor, cut common time
 Sanctus Adagio, D minor, cut common time
 "Pleni sunt coeli et terra" Allegro, D minor, common time
 "Hosanna in excelsis" Allegro, D minor, 3/4
 Benedictus Andante, G minor, common time; soprano/alto duet
 "Hosanna in excelsis" Allegro, D minor, 3/4
 Agnus Dei Andante, D minor, common time
 "Dona nobis pacem" Vivace, D minor, 3/8

References

External links
 
 
 
 
 

Masses by Wolfgang Amadeus Mozart
1769 compositions
Compositions in D minor